Tatiana Olegovna Nabieva (born November 21, 1994, in Pushkin) is a Russian artistic gymnast who has won four World Championship medals. She is known for the F-rated uneven bars skill named after her.

Gymnastics career

Junior career 
Nabieva competed at the 2008 European Junior Championships, earning gold medals in the team competition and floor exercise and silver medals on balance beam, vault and uneven bars. Although no all-around final was held, Nabieva held the highest all-around score in the qualifying competition, ahead of teammate Aliya Mustafina.

Senior career

2009–10 
Nabieva competed at the 2009 and 2010 Russian Championships. In 2009, she finished third in the all-around. In 2010, she competed only on vault and uneven bars due to an injury, and earned a bronze and a gold medal, respectively.

At the 2010 Japan Cup, she introduced a toe-on laid-out Tkachev on the uneven bars (a piked sole circle backwards to a reverse hecht in a layout position over the high bar).

She won gold with the Russian team at the 2010 World Artistic Gymnastics Championships, despite falling on the uneven bars in the team final. It was at these world championships that her original skill was officially named after her. She also qualified for the all-around final, but multiple errors left her in seventh place.

2011–12 
Nabieva performed consistently at the 2011 World Championships in Tokyo, competing on the uneven bars and vault and helping Russia win the silver medal. She qualified for the uneven bars event finals and won the silver medal behind teammate Viktoria Komova. She also placed sixth in the vault final with a double-twisting Yurchenko and a Yurchenko half-on piked half off.

In 2012, she struggled with back injuries. She was named as an alternate for the 2012 Summer Olympics in London.

2013–2014 
In March 2013, Nabieva placed second at the Russian National Championships on uneven bars, behind Anastasia Grishina.

In July, she returned to international competition at the 2013 Summer Universiade in Kazan with teammates Mustafina, Ksenia Afanasyeva, Maria Paseka and Anna Dementyeva. She contributed scores of 14.850 on vault, 14.400 on uneven bars, 13.750 on beam and 13.050 on floor toward the Russian team's first-place finish, but did not qualify for the all-around final because Afanasyeva placed ahead of her. In the uneven bars finals, she won the silver medal behind Mustafina. She went on to win gold medals in the all-around, uneven bars and vault at the 2013 Russian Cup.

In late 2013, Nabieva announced her retirement from gymnastics via social media after a win at a small French meet. She said: "I want to be a coach. That's my dream, since the very moment I started gymnastics. My dream is to train children and participate with them in the most serious competitions."

Nabieva was persuaded to come out of retirement to compete at the 2014 World Championships. She scored 14.933 on vault and helped the Russian team win the bronze medal.

Tatiana retired from gymnastics in 2016 along with 2008 Olympian Ekaterina Kramarenko and 2012 Olympic team silver medalist Anastasia Grishina, but returned to compete at the 2018 Russia National Championships where she qualified to the vault final.

2019
In July Nabieva competed for the first time internationally since 2014 at the 2019 Summer Universiade alongside Lilia Akhaimova and Ulyana Perebinosova. Together they won silver in the team final behind Japan.  During event finals Nabieva won silver on uneven bars behind Hitomi Hatakeda of Japan and won bronze on vault behind Marina Nekrasova of Azerbaijan and teammate Akhaimova.

Eponymous skill
Nabieva has one eponymous uneven bars release skill listed in the Code of Points.

Competitive history

International Scores

References

External links
 
 

1994 births
Living people
Russian female artistic gymnasts
Medalists at the World Artistic Gymnastics Championships
European champions in gymnastics
Originators of elements in artistic gymnastics
Gymnasts from Saint Petersburg
Universiade medalists in gymnastics
Universiade gold medalists for Russia
Universiade silver medalists for Russia
Universiade bronze medalists for Russia
Medalists at the 2013 Summer Universiade
Medalists at the 2019 Summer Universiade